Cymindis caudangula is a species of ground beetle in the subfamily Harpalinae. It was described by Kabak in 1997.

References

caudangula
Beetles described in 1997